The 1984 United States presidential election in Maryland took place on November 6, 1984, as part of the 1984 United States presidential election. Voters chose 10 representatives, or electors to the Electoral College, who voted for president and vice president.

Maryland was won by incumbent President Ronald Reagan (R-California), with 52.51% of the popular vote, over former Vice President Walter Mondale (D-Minnesota) with 47.02% of the popular vote, a 5.49% margin. Despite Reagan's victory in the state, it voted 12.73% more Democratic than the nation.  

For the first time, Maryland weighed in as the Democratic Party’s strongest state in the South (as defined by the U.S. Census Bureau). 

The vast majority of counties voted for Reagan, winning not just the traditionally Republican western region and Eastern Shore, but also the traditionally Democratic central portion of the state. The race, however, was close due to Mondale's strong performance in the city of Baltimore and Prince George's County, including Reagan's weak performance in Montgomery County, which he won by 888 votes, which also makes this the last time to date that a Republican won this county. This also marks the last time the Democratic candidate was held to under 60% of the vote in Prince George’s County, as it would vote for that party in increasingly large margins since this election.

Reagan ultimately won the national vote, defeating Mondale.

Results

Results by county

Counties that flipped from Democratic to Republican
Kent
Somerset

See also
 United States presidential elections in Maryland
 1984 United States presidential election
 1984 United States elections

Notes

References 

Maryland
1984
Presidential